Marvin Perry (born November 10, 1977) is a Trinidadian and Tobagonian former kickboxer.

Perry started training in Karate at the age of 13. He then trained for about two years before coming to the United States and beginning training in Kung Fu. After training in Kung Fu he was introduced to San Shou by Al Loriaux.

He is now retired and teaches as a Head Instructor at Red Line Fight Sports, a gym in Boston, Massachusetts.

The International Kickboxing Federation (IKF) national amateur heavyweight san shou title Perry won in 2001 was stripped by the IKF in 2002 when it found he had been fighting professionally since 2000.

Titles

2001 USKBA Muay Thai Heavyweight Champion 
2001 USKBA Super Cruiserweight Northeast Championship 
2001 IKF Amateur Heavyweight San Shou National Champion (stripped 2002)
2000 USKBA North East Full Contact Kickboxing Champion 
2000 USKBA Super Cruiserweight New England Championship Title 
2000 USAWKF West Coast San Shou National Champion
2000 USAWKF East Coast San Shou National Champion
1999 USAWKF San Shou National Champion
1998 USAWKF San Shou National Champion
1997 International Chinese Martial Arts San Shou Champion

References

External links
Marvin Perry's Web Site
Redline Fight Sports

1977 births
Living people
Trinidad and Tobago male  kickboxers
Cruiserweight kickboxers
Heavyweight kickboxers
Trinidad and Tobago sanshou practitioners
Trinidad and Tobago emigrants to the United States